The Connection is the debut album by American rapper DeLon. It was officially released on September 27, 2005. The first single from the album was "Calor de la Salsa", which peaked at No. 15 on the Billboard Hot Singles Sales chart and established DeLon as the first Sri Lankan to ever chart on the US Billboard charts. The Connection united hip hop listeners of all cultures as it features eclectic beats of different styles of cultural music mixed with American hip hop. With roots in salsa, samba, reggae, soca, Sri Lankan, Indian and Middle Eastern music, The Connection is an album that unites all cultures through international hip hop. As reviewed by YRB Magazine:"Hitting the rap game from all sides, [DeLon] manages to be 'conscious' and 'street' on the same album...a seamless merger of hot production, a catchy hook and the lyrical precision of a young Talib Kweli." - Yellow Rat Bastard (YRB) Magazine, Issue ..61 "The Connection" Review.
DeLon has won international praise for this album and is recognized as the first attempt by an American rap artist to unite international hip hop. Not only did DeLon write all lyrics and rap on the album, he is also responsible for producing 70% of the album's beats. The Connection was released through DeLon's record label, Ceylon Records.

Track listing

References 

2005 debut albums